Jay "Bluejay" Greenberg (born December 13, 1991) is an American composer and former child prodigy who entered the Juilliard School in 2002 at age 10.

Life and work
Greenberg was born in New Haven, Connecticut. He caught the attention of the American media through the sponsorship of Juilliard instructor Samuel Zyman during a CBS News 60 Minutes broadcast on November 28, 2004, when Greenberg was 12, and again in November 2006. Zyman told 60 Minutes, "We are talking about a prodigy of the level of the greatest prodigies in history, when it comes to composition. I am talking about the likes of Mozart, and Mendelssohn, and Saint-Saëns."

Greenberg's primary composition instructor was Samuel Adler.

He composes primarily on his computer using a music notation program and is mostly known for his work Overture to 9-11 about the September 11, 2001 terrorist attacks, which was featured on PRI's From the Top. On 9/11, he was living in Republic of Macedonia but has since returned to the United States. Neither his father, Robert Greenberg, a professor of Slavic languages at Yale University nor his Israeli-born mother have musical backgrounds, but Greenberg found himself attracted to music from an early age, having begun playing the cello at 2 years old.

Greenberg has said he hears the music performed inside his head, like many composers, and often several musical pieces simultaneously, and he is then able to simply notate what he has listened to, and rarely needs to make corrections to what he has notated.

The Sony Classical label released his first CD on August 15, 2006; it includes his Symphony No. 5 and String Quintet as performed by the London Symphony Orchestra under the direction of José Serebrier and by the Juilliard String Quartet with cellist Darrett Adkins respectively.

On October 28, 2007, Joshua Bell gave the premiere of Greenberg's Violin Concerto at Carnegie Hall, performing with the Orchestra of St. Luke's.

The 2011 contemporary classical album Troika includes Jay Greenberg's song "I still keep mute", setting a poem by Vladimir Nabokov.

Greenberg's works are published by G. Schirmer.

As of 2012 Greenberg was majoring in music at Peterhouse, Cambridge.

He is currently pursuing a DMus degree at the University of Auckland, New Zealand, under the supervision of Eve de Castro-Robinson.

Compositions
Greenberg's compositions include the following:

Orchestral
Symphony No. 5 (2005)
Intelligent Life (2006)
Skyline Dances - A Terpsichorean Couplet (2009) (commissioned by a consortium of youth orchestras)

Concertante
Concerto for Piano Trio and Orchestra (2007)
Violin Concerto (2007), commissioned by Joshua Bell

Chamber works
String Quintet (2004)
Sonata for violoncello and piano (2004)
Hexalogue for wind quintet and piano (2005)
Four Scenes for double string quartet (2008)
Quintet for Brass, op. 25 (2012)

Stage works
Neon Refracted: Ballet for chamber orchestra (2009), commissioned by New York City Ballet

References

External links
 Biography at IMG Artists
 "From the Top" episode featuring Greenberg and his 9/11 Overture (starts at 36:xx)
 "Jay Greenberg: A Korngold For Our Times" by Isidor Saslav
 "USA's Musically Gifted Youths:JAY GREENBERG at age 12 (2004)" at YouTube
 "USA's Musically Gifted Youths: JAY GREENBERG at age 15 (2007)" at YouTube

1991 births
Living people
21st-century classical composers
American child musicians
American classical cellists
American people of Israeli descent
American male classical composers
American classical composers
Musicians from New Haven, Connecticut
Pupils of Samuel Adler (composer)
Sony Classical Records artists
21st-century American composers
21st-century American male musicians
21st-century cellists